Protopopintsi is a village in the municipality of Chuprene, in Vidin Province, in northwestern Bulgaria. It is on the Chuprenska River and surrounded by other villages such as Borovitsa, Sredogriv, Bostanite, Targovishte, Replyana, and Yanyovets.

References

Villages in Vidin Province